Paul Adams (August 10, 1920 – June 30, 2013) was a World War II pilot with the Tuskegee Airmen. He was one of the first black teachers in the Lincoln Nebraska public school system. Adams also served as the president of the Lincoln Chapter of the NAACP. In 2008 the city of Lincoln Nebraska built a new elementary school and named it after Adams. The mascot of the school in an aviator.

Military service

Adams joined the army in 1942 and began fighter pilot training at Tuskegee University in Alabama. He was commissioned 2nd Lieutenant in 1943. He was assigned to the 332nd Fighter Group and sent to Naples Italy.

In 1945, Captain Adams came back to the United States and was discharged. In 1947 Adams reenlisted in the army as a 1st Lieutenant. After many assignments eventually Adams was assigned to Lincoln Nebraska as Deputy Base Commander.

Awards
Air Medal with 3 Oak Leaf Clusters
Congressional Gold Medal awarded to the Tuskegee Airmen in 2006
President's Honor of Distinction Award Doane College 2007

Education
Sterling High School, Class of 1938
South Carolina State College, Class of 1941
Tuskegee University Class of 1943

Personal life
Adams was a native of Greenville, South Carolina. After he graduated from college he joined the United States Army Air Force. He flew missions in World War II with the Tuskegee Airmen. Adams married Alda Virginia Thompson in 1946 and together they had three children. The Army assigned Adams to Lincoln Nebraska in 1962. Adams stayed in service until 1963. He retired in 1963 and began teaching industrial arts at Lincoln High School in 1964–1982. He was one of the first black teachers in the Lincoln Nebraska public school system. Adams also served as the president of the Lincoln Chapter of the NAACP.

See also
 Executive Order 9981
 List of Tuskegee Airmen
 Military history of African Americans

References

Notes

External links
Tuskegee Airmen at Tuskegee University
 Tuskegee Airmen Archives at the University of California, Riverside Libraries.
 Tuskegee Airmen, Inc.
 Tuskegee Airmen National Historic Site (U.S. National Park Service) 
 Tuskegee Airmen National Museum
 Fly (2009 play about the 332d Fighter Group)
 Executive Order 9981
 List of African American Medal of Honor recipients
 Military history of African Americans

1920 births
2013 deaths
People from Greenville, South Carolina
Tuskegee Airmen
Tuskegee University alumni
Military personnel from Tuskegee, Alabama
People from South Carolina
Congressional Gold Medal recipients
United States Air Force officers
United States Army Air Forces pilots of World War II
African-American aviators
21st-century African-American people